= Farai Morobane =

Farai Morobane is a South African public policy manager for human rights at Meta Platforms and an LGBT activist for the African continent, heading the organization LGBT+Forum. She has written extensively on LGBT issues, women’s rights, and income inequality across Africa.
